The Silberen (2,319 m) is a mountain of the Schwyzer Alps, located east of the Pragel Pass in the canton of Schwyz. On its eastern side the mountain overlooks the lake of Klöntal.

The summit consists of a large karstic plateau. The name, meaning silver in English, derives from the light color of the bare rock.

In winter, it is a popular mountain for ski touring.

References

External links

 Silberen on Hikr

Mountains of Switzerland
Mountains of the Alps
Mountains of the canton of Schwyz